Perón: apuntes para una biografía is a 2010 Argentine documentary film about Juan Domingo Perón. It features a number of Argentine historians like Norberto Galasso, and it is focused mainly in Perón early life and his intervention in the Revolution of '43. His government is described in a brief summary at the end, and it doesn't reference his life after the Revolución Libertadora military coup that ousted him from power. It is written and directed by the Argentine secretary of culture, Jorge Coscia. It is the eight biography film produced by Caras y Caretas.

The film includes old photos, video archives, recordings at key sites of his early life and interviews with historians.

See also
 Early life of Juan Perón

References

External links

2010 films
2010s Spanish-language films
Argentine documentary films
2010 documentary films
Juan Perón
Documentary films about politicians
2010s Argentine films